The ACBS Asian Snooker Championship is the premier non-professional snooker tournament in Asia. The event series is sanctioned by the Asian Confederation of Billiard Sports and started from 1984. Mostly, the winner of the tournament qualifies for the next season of the Professional Snooker Tour.

Winners

Men's

Women's

Winners (6Reds & Team Snooker)
ACBS Asian 6 Reds Snooker Championship: Indian Pankaj Advani claimed the 5th edition ACBS Asian 6 Reds Snooker Championship on in Abu Dhabi.

1- 2012

2- 2013 - Doha - Qatar

3- 2014 - Karachi - Pakistan 3rd Snooker 6-Red and 2nd Snooker Team Championships

4- 2015 - Kish Island - Iran

5- 2016 - Abu Dhabi - UAE

6- 2017 - Bishkek - Kyrgyzstan

7- 2018 - Doha - Qatar

8- 2019 - Doha - Qatar

Billiards Sports
1st Asian Billiards Sport 2016 was held in 24 September - 2 October 2016 - Al Fujairah - UAE.

100 up Billiard
17th Asian 100 up Billiards Championship → Yangon - Myanmar 2018

English Billiards Championships

Hosts

ACBS Asian Tour 10 RED

1st ACBS ASIAN TOUR 10 RED : Doha - Qatar 2018

2nd ACBS ASIAN TOUR 10 RED : Jinan – China 2018

Stats

Champions by country (Men's)

Champions by country (Women's)

See also
 World Snooker Tour
 IBSF World Billiards Championship
 World Billiards Championship (English billiards)
 Cue sports at the Asian Games

References

Snooker amateur competitions
Recurring sporting events established in 1984
1984 establishments in Asia
Snooker in Asia
Snooker